Alessio Sestu (born 29 September 1983) is an Italian footballer.

Career

Treviso
Born in Rome, Lazio region, Sestu started his career at one of the two Serie A club in the capital – Lazio. In July 2002 Sestu joined Modena, but in January 2003 left for Treviso
Sestu was sold to Serie C2 club Südtirol in co-ownership deal in summer 2003. In June 2004 Treviso bought back Sestu through sealed bid submitted to Lega Calcio. He then played for clubs in Serie B and Serie C1 in temporary deals, since January 2005. He became a regular for Avellino in Serie B 2007–08, made him signed by Reggina on 28 August 2008. Previously in June 2008 Avellino signed him from Treviso in co-ownership deal for €400,000 and Reggina bought the remain half of the registration rights from Treviso.

Reggina
As a new signing of Reggina, Sestu made his Serie A debut on 14 September 2008 against Torino. He also played twice at 2008–09 Coppa Italia. In June 2009 Avellino bought Reggina's half but the club then went bankrupt, made Sestu became free agent.

Vicenza
On 1 September 2009, Sestu was moved to Vicenza on free transfer. On 1 February 2010, he signed a loan by Bari for the rest of the season.

Siena
In August 2010 Sestu left for Siena in co-ownership deal for €525,000 in 3-year contract, made Vicenza had a profit of €1.05 million (as it was presumed another 50% registration rights was sold for the same price). In June 2011 Siena acquired outright for another pre-agreed €525,000, and Vicenza got half of the registration rights of Domenico Danti tagged for €425,000, made Siena only paid €100,000 cash to Vicenza.

Chievo
On 11 July 2013 Sestu was signed by A.C. ChievoVerona on a free transfer.

On 31 January 2014, he joined Sampdoria on a loan deal. On 1 September 2014 Sestu was signed by Serie B club Brescia Calcio, with Mario Gargiulo moved to Verona.

Retirement and later career
In December 2020, Sestu signed for Eccellenza club Portogruaro. In June 2022, Sestu retired and was hired as sporting director for Portogruaro.

Personal life
His parent were from the island of Sardinia.

References

External links
 Lega Serie B profile 
 Profile at La Gazzetta (2008–09) 
 

1983 births
Living people
Italian footballers
Association football midfielders
Footballers from Rome
F.C. Südtirol players
Treviso F.B.C. 1993 players
A.S. Cittadella players
Mantova 1911 players
U.S. Salernitana 1919 players
U.S. Avellino 1912 players
Reggina 1914 players
L.R. Vicenza players
S.S.C. Bari players
A.C.N. Siena 1904 players
A.C. ChievoVerona players
U.C. Sampdoria players
Brescia Calcio players
Virtus Entella players
Piacenza Calcio 1919 players
Serie A players
Serie B players
Serie D players